Andrea Holland is a former British synchronized swimmer and coach of the Swiss and British synchronized swimming teams. She competed at the 1978 World Aquatics Championships, where she finished 4th in the duet event and the 1977 European Aquatics Championships, where she received a gold medal in the duet event with Jackie Cox.

Since the 90's, she has been a synchronized swimming freelance commentator.

Notes

External links
 Andrea Holland Twitter account

British synchronised swimmers
Living people
Year of birth missing (living people)
Place of birth missing (living people)